William Combe (1742–1823) was a British writer.

William Combe may also refer to:

William Combe (15th century MP), MP for Chichester
William Combe (died 1610) (1551–1610), MP for Droitwich, Warwick and Warwickshire
William Combe (died 1667) (1586–1667), MP for Warwickshire

See also
William Combs (disambiguation)